Miro Heiskanen (born 18 July 1999) is a Finnish professional ice hockey defenceman and alternate captain for the Dallas Stars of the National Hockey League (NHL). Ranked in the top ten eligible European skaters by the NHL Central Scouting Bureau, Heiskanen was picked third overall in the 2017 NHL Entry Draft by the Stars.

Playing career

Liiga career (2014–2017)

Heiskanen played hockey until the age of 14 in the youth program of the Finnish Liiga club Espoo Blues. Later, Heiskanen played within the youth program of HIFK. In playing at the Junior A level during the 2015–16 season, he recorded 14 points in 30 games to be awarded with the Yrjö Hakala Award as rookie of the year. On 30 May 2016, he signed a three-year contract extension with the HIFK organization.

During the 2016–17 Liiga season, at age 17, Heiskanen made his professional debut with HIFK in the Liiga. In playing the full season in the Liiga, he played on HIFK's top defensive pairing, scoring 5 goals and 10 points in 37 games. HIFK head coach Antti Törmänen described him as his team's best defenceman that season, praising his ability to always make the right decisions. By the end of the season, Heiskanen was considered a top prospect at the 2017 NHL Entry Draft, with Göran Stubb of the NHL Central Scouting Bureau describing him as "by far the best European defenceman in the draft". Heiskanen was ultimately selected third overall by the Dallas Stars.

On 8 July 2017, Heiskanen signed a three-year, entry-level contract with the Stars. Heiskanen spent the 2017–18 Liiga season on loan with HIFK.

Dallas Stars (2018–present)
Heiskanen was named to the Stars' roster to start the 2018–19 NHL season and made his debut on 4 October in a 3–0 win over the Arizona Coyotes. On 25 October, in a 5–2 Stars win over the Anaheim Ducks, Heiskanen scored his first career NHL goal, beating goaltender John Gibson off a pass from Jason Spezza. In so doing, at 19 years and 99 days, Heiskanen became the second-youngest Stars defenceman to score a goal in the franchise's history. On 2 January 2019, Heiskanen was named the Stars' lone representative at the 2019 NHL All-Star Game, becoming the second rookie in the Stars/North Stars franchise history to be named to the All-Star Game. At the time of his selection, he was tied for seventh in the league among rookies and second among rookie defencemen with 17 points. After the Stars qualified for the 2019 Stanley Cup playoffs, Heiskanen became the third defencemen under the age of 20 to score two goals in a playoff game. 

On 30 August 2020, in Game 4 of the Stars' second round playoff series against the Colorado Avalanche, Heiskanen would set the Stars' playoff record for points by a defenceman with 16. In reaching the 2020 Stanley Cup Finals, Heiskanen ended the playoff campaign with 26 points in 27 games, the fourth most by any defenceman during a playoff year in league history, behind only Paul Coffey in 1985, Brian Leetch in 1994 and Al MacInnis in 1989. The Stars would ultimately lose to the Tampa Bay Lightning in six games.

On 17 July 2021, Heiskanen signed an eight-year, $67.6 million contract with the Stars.

In 2022 Heiskanen won the gold medal in the IIHF world championship tournament with Team Finland.

Career statistics

Regular season and playoffs

International

Awards and honours

References

External links
 

1999 births
Living people
Dallas Stars draft picks
Dallas Stars players
Finnish expatriate ice hockey players in the United States
Finnish ice hockey defencemen
HIFK players
Ice hockey players at the 2018 Winter Olympics
National Hockey League first-round draft picks
Olympic ice hockey players of Finland
Sportspeople from Espoo